Sigdal House is an historic Norwegian log home which was relocated to Minot, North Dakota.

The Sigdal House is a 230-year-old house originally from the Vatnas area of Sigdal, Norway.  It is located in the Scandinavian Heritage Park situated in the Upper Brooklyn neighborhood of Minot, North Dakota. It is typical of houses common to rural Norway during the 19th century. The decorations on the doors inside the house as they were painted about 1800 and were restored prior to the house coming to America. The house was purchased by the Scandinavian Heritage Association and restored to museum standards. The house had been dismantled in Norway, shipped to and reassembled on site at the park. The completed house was dedicated on October 15, 1991 during the annual Norsk Høstfest.

References

Related Reading
Dregni, Eric (2014) Vikings in the Attic: In Search of Nordic America (University of Minnesota Press) 
Dregni, Eric  (2006) Midwest Marvels: Roadside Attractions Across Iowa, Minnesota, the Dakotas, and Wisconsin (University of Minnesota Press)

External links
Scandinavian Heritage Association website
Hostfest website

Buildings and structures in Minot, North Dakota
Parks in North Dakota
Norwegian-American culture in North Dakota
Tourist attractions in Minot, North Dakota
Relocated buildings and structures in North Dakota
Log houses in the United States
Wooden buildings and structures in Norway
Houses in Ward County, North Dakota